Cephetola collinsi, the Collins' epitola, is a butterfly in the family Lycaenidae. It is found in Ivory Coast, Ghana, Togo and southern Nigeria. Its habitat consists of forests.

References

Butterflies described in 1999
Poritiinae